tvG2 (previously G2) is a Spanish free-to-air television channel owned and operated by Televisión de Galicia S.A., the television subsidiary of Galician regional-owned public broadcaster Corporación Radio e Televisión de Galicia (CRTVG). It is the corporation's second television channel.

History
The channel was officially launched as G2 on February 2, 2009. Previously, TVG América's programming was broadcast on that signal, complemented by sports on weekends. On September 14, 2009, the channel completed its programming creation process, it was also renamed TvG2 for which reason it began to broadcast some spaces that were previously part of the programming of the main channel.

Programming
TvG2 is known for broadcasting documentaries, sports and programming for children and teenagers in Galician language. From Monday to Friday, the programming focuses on children's, youth and cultural programs. While on weekends sporting events are broadcast, especially the Segunda RFEF and Tercera RFEF football leagues.

References

External links
www.crtvg.es
tvG2 listings at crtvg.es

Corporación Radio e Televisión de Galicia
Television stations in Spain
Television channels and stations established in 2009
Spanish-language television stations
Television stations in Galicia (Spain)
Mass media in Santiago de Compostela